Sonia Raman is an American professional basketball coach who is an assistant coach for the Memphis Grizzlies of the National Basketball Association (NBA). She served as the head coach of the MIT Engineers women's basketball team from 2008 to 2020, and had the most wins in the team's history. In September 2020 she became an assistant coach for the Memphis Grizzlies.

College & legal career
Raman attended Framingham High School in Framingham, Massachusetts. She started her college career at Tufts University in 1992 and joined the basketball team as a walk-on. Raman played off the bench as a guard until she was sidelined with a broken leg after she was hit by a car in her junior year. Raman began to develop her coaching abilities during her playing absence while encouraging her teammates and studying basketball. She served as team co-captain during her senior season. Raman graduated from Tufts University in 1996 with a Bachelor of Arts degree in International Relations and went on to receive a Juris Doctor from Boston College Law School in 2001.

After graduating from law school she worked for Fidelity Investments and the United States Department of Labor.

Coaching career
Raman began her intercollegiate coaching career with a two-year stint as an assistant coach at Tufts.

On July 9, 2008, Raman was named head coach of the MIT Engineers women's basketball team after serving as an assistant coach at Wellesley College for the previous six years. Raman was named New England Women’s and Men’s Athletic Conference (NEWMAC) Women's Basketball Coach of the Year in 2016 and 2017.

On September 11, 2020, the Memphis Grizzlies of the National Basketball Association (NBA) announced Raman was hired as an assistant coach. She became the first Indian-American woman and the 14th woman to be named as an NBA coach. Raman had developed a relationship with Rich Cho, the Grizzlies' vice president of basketball strategy, who she first encountered when Cho was looking for student intern recommendations. Grizzlies head coach, Taylor Jenkins, was "blown away" by Raman and had no qualms in hiring her despite her relative unknown status. Raman works in scouting, player development and analytics for the Grizzlies.

Personal life
Raman was born in the United States to Indian immigrant parents.

See also
 List of female NBA coaches

References 

Living people
Year of birth missing (living people)
American sportspeople of Indian descent
American women's basketball coaches
American women's basketball players
Boston College Law School alumni
Guards (basketball)
Memphis Grizzlies assistant coaches
Tufts University alumni
21st-century American lawyers
21st-century American women
Tufts Jumbos